Kim Jin-pyo (born 4 May 1947) is a South Korean politician who previously served as a government minister under two liberal Presidents Kim Dae-jung and Roh Moo-hyun and has represented Suwon at the National Assembly since 2004. He has dedicated his career in public service as a public servant for 30 years and then as government minister and a parliamentarian. He belongs to the more conservative wing of the liberal Democratic Party.

Pre-Minister career 
After passing the state exam in 1974, he began his career as a public servant at one of regional offices of National Tax Service. Apart from working for Deputy Prime Minister Rha Woong-bae as his chief of staff for five months in 1996, he continued working on tax. He was part of a small task-force to prepare "real-name financial system" and one of nine people apart from then-President Kim Young-sam who knew about this before it was announced by the president.

Under President Kim Dae-jung, he led the Tax and Customs Office of the Ministry of Finance and Economy from 1991 and oversaw the implementation of newly-created "real-name real estate system." From 2001 he led the Ministry as its Vice-Minister. From January 2002, he worked on building country-wide High-speed Internet as Senior Presidential Secretary for Policy Planning and later appointed as Minister for Government Policy Coordination.

In 2002 then-President-elect Roh Moo-hyun appointed him as vice chair of his transition team praising him as "the most capable public servant I have ever met."

Member of State Council and National Assembly 
Kim later became Roh's first Minister of Finance and Economy and ex officio Deputy Prime Minister in 2003. In 2004 he resigned for the 2004 general election upon Roh's recommendation. After successfully securing his seat at the parliament, he was brought back to Roh's cabinet as his Minister of Education and Human Resources Development and ex officio Deputy Prime Minister.

In 2007 he became the chair of Policy Planning Committee of his party, Uri Party, and its succeeding party, United New Democratic Party. From 2008 to 2010 he served as a member of his party's Supreme Council.

In 2010 he ran for his party's candidate for Gyeonggi Provincial Governor but dropped out after endorsing Rhyu Si-min from other liberal party.

In 2011 he was elected as the floor leader of this party which he continued to serve in succeeding party till 2012.

In the 2014 election, he resigned from the post of three-term parliamentarian to run as his party's candidate for Gyeonggi Governor but lost to Nam Kyung-pil from opposition party.

In 2015 he became a member of advisory committee to then-party leader Moon Jae-in. He organised the "policy exposition" of his party - the first of its kind in South Korean history.

In 2017 Kim joined Moon Jae-in's second presidential campaign in 2017 as the chair of its jobs committee.

Upon the beginning of Moon Jae-in's presidency, Kim was appointed as the chair of State Affairs Planning Advisory Committee, Moon's de facto transition team, as Moon began his presidency without having one. The Committee produced detailed blueprint of Moon's 5-year administration with 100 policy tasks based on Moon's campaign promises.

Kim Jin-pyo was elected as the Speaker of the National Assembly to be occupied by the Democratic Party of Korea.

Early life and education 
Kim was born in Yeonbaek County, now North Korean territory. During Third Battle of Seoul he and his father moved south and settled in now-Suwon. He was admitted to Kyungbock High School as top of his class.

He holds two degrees - LLB from Seoul National University where he completed his postgraduate programme on public policy and Master of Public Affairs from University of Wisconsin–Madison.

Political positions 

He belongs to the most conservative faction of Democratic Party of Korea. However, he was elected as the Speaker of the National Assembly with the support of the majority of DPK members. As the speaker of the National Assembly, he was criticized by various members of the party for putting the brakes on various policies promoted by the party without agreement with the party. He was rated more conservative than the center-right Bareun Party in a South Korean media survey.

He supports economic liberalism including real estate deregulation. He argued against the government's position that the sale price was disclosed in order to prevent the skyrocketing house price in the past, and argued that the disclosure of the sale price was socialism.

He also takes a socially conservative stance. He introduced the 'homosexuality healing movement' as one of the solutions to the low birth rate. He has strong opposition to homosexuality and same-sex marriage. In the past, he made remarks such as, "The religious world should promote childbirth, oppose abortion, and campaign against homosexuality and same-sex marriage in accordance with God's spirit of creation." Because of this position, some organizations have received claims that they "condemn hate against LGBTI people."

He has a very close relationship with the church and opposes taxing religious people. He said at a religious event in the past, "I think that only through theocracy can we regain the trust of the people and play the role of check and balance as an opposition party." It was pointed out that this remark violated the separation of church and state.

He influenced the withdrawal of the operating room cctv installation, which is considered one of the reform legislation. He claimed to be in favor, but suddenly took a stance against it. Regarding this, it was criticized by several members of the party as "a breach of trust that betrays the will of sovereignty." According to an opinion poll, about 80% of Koreans supported the installation of CCTV in operating rooms.

Electoral history

See also 
 Conservative Democrat (United States)

Notes

References

External links
 김진표 홈페이지

1947 births
Living people
Minjoo Party of Korea politicians
People from Gyeonggi Province
Members of the National Assembly (South Korea)
Uri Party politicians
Robert M. La Follette School of Public Affairs alumni
Anti-abortion activists
Conservatism in South Korea
Discrimination against LGBT people in South Korea
Seoul National University School of Law alumni
Government ministers of South Korea
Education ministers of South Korea
Finance ministers of South Korea
Deputy Prime Ministers of South Korea
Kyungbock High School alumni
Speakers of the National Assembly (South Korea)